Qatar participated at the 2018 Asian Para Games which was held in Jakarta, Indonesia from 6 to 13 October 2018. The Qatari delegation was composed of 13 athletes who participated in two sports: seven in athletics and six in goalball. Abdulqader al-Mutawa was the head of the delegation, Mohamed Deheem al-Dosari was the deputy head of the mission, and Mohamed Suhail was the technical expert. Qatar won its sole medal through Sarah Hamdi Masoud in the sport of athletics.

Medalist

Athletics

Competitors:
 Abdulrahman Abdulqadir
 Nasser Al Sahouti
 Khalid Al Hajri
 Debais Al Dosari
 Mohammad Al Abd
 Mohammad Rahsed Al Kebaisi 
 Sara Hamdi Masoud

Goalball

Coach: Abdulqader Khadim

Competitors:
 Mohammad Hamam Al Mohammad
 Mohammad Al Kahalout
 Abbad Shamali
 Ikrami Murad
 Hassan Al Kohaji 
 Abdulhadi Al Marri

See also
 Qatar at the 2018 Asian Games

References

Nations at the 2018 Asian Para Games
Qatar at the Asian Para Games
2018 in Qatari sport